Pals in Paradise is a lost 1926 American silent drama film directed by George B. Seitz. The film was shot in Europe.

Cast
 Rudolph Schildkraut as Abraham Lezinsky
 John Bowers as Bill Harvey
 Marguerite De La Motte as Geraldine 'Jerry' Howard
 May Robson as Esther Lezinsky
 Alan Brooks as John Kenton
 Ernie Adams as Butterfly Kid
 Bruce Gordon as Gentleman Phil

References

External links

1926 films
American silent feature films
1926 drama films
Films directed by George B. Seitz
American black-and-white films
Lost American films
Silent American drama films
Producers Distributing Corporation films
1926 lost films
Lost drama films
1920s American films